Middleton Towers railway station was a station in Middleton, Norfolk. It was on the line between Swaffham and King's Lynn, and closed along with the rest of the line in 1968.

History

The Lynn & Dereham Railway Bill received the Royal Assent on 21 July 1845. The line and its railway stations were opened on 27 October 1846 as far as Narborough. Middleton railway station opened with the line and was situated south-east of Lynn station and north-west of East Winch. While the line was still being built the Lynn & Dereham was taken over by the East Anglian Railway on 22 July 1847. The line reached Swaffham on 10 August 1847. The station was renamed from Middleton to Middleton Towers on 1 November 1924.

After a large housing development was completed in Leziate in 1990, the line between Middleton Towers and King's Lynn was considered for restoration as a passenger route. With the electrification of the main line between Cambridge and King's Lynn the provision of rolling stock was a major issue.

The railway between the station and King's Lynn remains in use as a goods line, and the station has been the destination of a number of charter trains. A sand loading silo has been constructed on the former main line to Swaffham east of the station.

A campaign was launched in 2021, to restore the Middleton Towers site to be used as a public tea room and as a museum for the former Lynn and Dereham railway.

References

Bibliography

External links

Disused railway stations in Norfolk
Former Great Eastern Railway stations
Railway stations in Great Britain opened in 1846
Railway stations in Great Britain closed in 1968
1846 establishments in England
1968 disestablishments in England